The golden-rumped euphonia (Chlorophonia cyanocephala) is a species of bird in the family Fringillidae, formerly placed in the Thraupidae. It is found in Argentina, Bolivia, Brazil, Colombia, Ecuador, French Guiana, Guyana, Paraguay, Peru, Suriname, Trinidad and Tobago, and Venezuela. 

It was formerly classified in the genus Euphonia, but phylogenetic evidence indicates that it groups with Chlorophonia.

Its natural habitats are subtropical or tropical moist lowland forest, subtropical or tropical moist montane forest, and heavily degraded former forest.

References

golden-rumped euphonia
Birds of the Northern Andes
Birds of Trinidad and Tobago
Birds of Brazil
Birds of Paraguay
golden-rumped euphonia
Taxa named by Louis Jean Pierre Vieillot
Taxonomy articles created by Polbot
Taxobox binomials not recognized by IUCN